The 2012 United States presidential election in Connecticut took place on November 6, 2012, as part of the 2012 United States presidential election in which all 50 states plus the District of Columbia participated. Connecticut voters chose seven electors to represent them in the Electoral College via a popular vote pitting incumbent Democratic President Barack Obama and his running mate, Vice President Joe Biden, against Republican challenger and former Massachusetts Governor Mitt Romney and his running mate, Congressman Paul Ryan. Obama and Biden carried Connecticut with 58.1% of the popular vote to Romney's and Ryan's 40.7%, thus winning the state's seven electoral votes. Romney managed to flip the traditionally Republican Litchfield County,  which Obama managed to win in 2008.  This is the most recent presidential election when the Democratic candidate won Windham County.  

As of the 2020 United States presidential election, this was the most recent time that the Democratic presidential nominee won the towns of Berlin, Bozrah, Brooklyn, Chaplin, East Haven, Franklin, Griswold, Killingly, Lebanon, Lisbon, Naugatuck, North Branford, North Haven, North Stonington, Plainfield, Plainville, Putnam, Salem, Southington, Sprague, Stafford, Union, and Voluntown. This was also the most recent time that the Republican presidential nominee won the towns of Avon, Darien, East Granby, Easton, Granby, Greenwich, Newtown, New Canaan, Ridgefield, and Wilton. As of 2020, this is the most recent time that Connecticut voted to the right of Delaware. Obama was the first Democrat since 1916 to win the election without the municipalities of Torrington and Thompson and the first since 1932 to win without the town of Plymouth.

Primaries

Democratic
As Barack Obama was the only candidate to qualify, no Democratic primary was held.

Republican

The 2012 Connecticut Republican presidential primary took place on April 24, 2012. It was a closed primary, open only to Republican electors. 25 of the state's 28 delegates to the 2012 Republican National Convention were decided by the primary outcome, with the other 3 being superdelegates: the state party chairman and the state's two Republican National Committee representatives.

Mitt Romney won the primary by a wide margin, garnering two-thirds of the vote. Only 14.4% of active registered Republicans participated in the primary, the lowest turnout since the primary format was put in place in the state in 1980.

Process
After switching from proportional distribution of delegates to a winner-take-all system in 1996, the Connecticut Republican Party voted in September 2011 to award delegates by a hybrid winner-take-all and proportional distribution process beginning with the 2012 primary. Of the 25 regular delegates at stake in the primary, the party called for three delegates to be awarded to the winner of each of the state's five congressional districts on a winner-take-all basis for a total of 15 delegates. The remaining 10 would be distributed proportionally based on the statewide vote total among candidates receiving at least 20% support unless a candidate won a majority of the statewide vote, in which case the candidate would receive all 10 of these delegates.

With Romney's primary day wins in all five congressional districts and a majority of the statewide vote, he was able to claim all 25 of the delegates at stake.

Opinion polling

Results

Official source reports a turnout of 59,639, with the difference from 59,578 likely due to blank ballots.

General election

Ballot access
 Mitt Romney/Paul Ryan, Republican
 Barack Obama/Joseph Biden, Democratic
 Gary Johnson/James P. Gray, Libertarian
 Rocky Anderson/Luis J. Rodriguez, Justice
Write-in candidate access:
 Jill Stein/Cheri Honkala, Green
 Virgil Goode/Jim Clymer, Constitution
 Raymond Sizemore/Vicki Tomalin, Independent

Results

Results by county

Counties that flipped from Democratic to Republican
 Litchfield (largest city: Torrington)

Results by congressional district
Obama won all 5 congressional districts.

See also
 United States presidential elections in Connecticut
 2012 Republican Party presidential debates and forums
 2012 Republican Party presidential primaries
 Results of the 2012 Republican Party presidential primaries
 Connecticut Republican Party

References

External links
The Green Papers: for Connecticut
The Green Papers: Major state elections in chronological order

Connecticut
United States President
2012